Iorana (Rapanui: Hello and Goodbye) is a Chilean telenovela produced by TVN. It was written by Fernando Aragón, Arnaldo Madrid, Hugo Morales and Nona Fernández. Directed by Vicente Sabatini, Patricio González and Rodrigo Sepúlveda.

Plot
Cristián (Álvaro Morales) is in love with the beautiful Rapanui girl Vaitea (Alejandra Fosalba). They have decided to marry, but several diverse and alien interests stand between them. The most important of them: the past of Cristián's father, Fernando Balbontín (Francisco Reyes), who fled his home on Easter Island 15 years ago, accused of a crime that he did not commit. The announcement of his impending return, and that he dying, sends shockwaves through the small island community. His wife, Josefa Soublette (Claudia di Girolamo), having believed him to be dead long ago, has married his friend Luciano Cox (Alfredo Castro), an extremely ambitious and unscrupulous man who is secretly responsible for the crime that has been attributed to Balbontín for years: the fire at the Rapa Nui Archaeological Museum, in which valuable archaeological pieces had been lost.

Fernando has returned to Rapa Nui to fulfill a double objective: to take revenge on Josefa and Luciano, and to recover the love of his children, who are torn between having indifference or loyalty to their father. The revenge is to be carried out by Fernando with the aid of two characters, both personified by Balbontín himself. The supposedly dying Balbontín, protected within a biohazard ventilator, is closely guarded by the first of these characters, Arístides Concha, his private doctor, who inserts himself into the daily life of Josefa and Luciano trying to act as a friend and mediator between them and Fernando. The second character of his invention is his "friend," the French captain Antoine Dumont, the executor of his fortune, who has "just arrived" on Easter Island to accompany him in his last days. Dumont also serves as a way to torture Josefa, falling in love with her and trying to drive a wedge between her and Luciano. This succeeds temporarily when Josefa evicts Lucanio from their home. Fernando is helped in all this by his friend Rodolfo "Pájaro" Tuki, to keep anyone on the island from discovering their plans, or Fernando's identity.

On the other hand, Cristián, who is Balbontín's eldest son, is now the island's star diver and has grown up adopting all the forms and cultures of Rapa Nui, to the point that he has become an islander, calling himself “Iriti”. He has lived in a cave located on the rocks of the distant beach of Ovahe ever since leaving the house of his mother, Josefa, when she married Luciano. But everything gets complicated when Cristián meets Paula Novoa (Carolina Fadic), an ambitious, beautiful and obsessive journalist from the mainland who is searching for the submerged Moai, and he becomes romantically involved with her, leaving behind his commitment to Vaitea. This also creates a rif between Cristián and his brother, Rafael, who has also been taken in by Paula's charm. Meanwhile, the island's elder Nua Eva (Mireya Véliz) enlists the help of Rapanui youngsters Tiare (Blanca Lewin) and Siu (Juan Falcón) to keep Paula and her journalist friends Francisca and Álan from discovering the secret location of the Moai, if it really exists. With Cristián now abandoning Vaitea for Paula, Siu begins to court her, while Tiare tries to avoid the romantic advances of Álan.

In the second storyline, Gregorio Peñailillo (Eduardo Barril), the government-appointed delegate minister, has an extramarital relationship with Dolores Miru on Rapa Nui, while still married to his wife Virginia Sáenz in Santiago. While Gregorio and Virginia have a daughter, Susana, he also has a daughter via Dolores, Tahía. Things become complicated for Gregorio when Virginia and Susana arrive on the island to live with him, and Susana enters the same school that Tahía attends. The initial relationship between Susana and Tahía is one of hostility and suspicion, and is further complicated when they each discover they are sisters, while their mothers, unaware of Gregorio's actions, have become best friends.

Among the colorful personalities that interact with the main characters include Dr. Andrés Maturana, the island's young doctor who feels overshadowed by Dr. Concha and is determined to get rid of him, Isabel Tepu, Gregorio's secretary who insists on not wearing shoes, and Ingrid Astudillo, the island's teacher who becomes obsessed with Captain Dumont.

Cast
 Francisco Reyes as Fernando Balbontín Serrano - Dr. Arístides Concha - Captain Antonie Dumont
 Claudia di Girolamo as Josefa Soublette Alcalde
 Álvaro Morales as Cristían "Iriti" Balbontín Soublette
 Alejandra Fosalba as Vaitea Ahoa Tuki
 Alfredo Castro as Luciano Cox Fernández
 Carolina Fadic as Paula Novoa
 Eduardo Barril as Gregorio Peñailillo
 Delfina Guzmán as Virginia Sáenz
 José Soza as Rodolfo "Pájaro" Tuki
 Tamara Acosta as Tahía Pañailillo Miru
 Pablo Schwarz as Dr. Andrés Maturana "Aringa poki"
 Francisca Imboden as Susana Pañailillo Sáenz
 Juan Falcón as Siu Teao
 Amparo Noguera as Ingrid Astudillo
 Claudia Burr as Teresita Apablaza
 Felipe Braun as Rafael Balbontín Soublette
 Viviana Rodríguez as Francisca "Matakuri" Labbé Soublette
 Francisco Melo as Yorgo Ismael
 Carmen Disa Gutiérrez as Dolores Míru
 Sergio Hernández as Mike Ahoa
 Mariel Bravo as Cristina Tukí
 Óscar Hernández as Lázaro Tepano
 Consuelo Holzapfel as Angélica Riroroko
 Blanca Lewin as Tiare Tepano
 Nicolás Fontaine as Álan Carter
 Antonia Zegers as Margaret Olivares Tuki
 Hugo Medina as Hotu Pakarati
 Roxana Campos as Carmen Abarca
 Erto Pantoja as Petero Pakomio
 Lorene Prieto as Isabel Tepu
 Néstor Cantillana as Patricio Tepano
 Ana Luz Figueroa as Isadora Ahoa
 Nicolás Saavedra as Ariki Foitzmann
 Mireya Véliz as Nua Eva
 José Martín as Father Walter
 Mario Montilles as Taote Pulgar
 Ana Reeves as Minerva Barros
 Pedro Rivadeneira as Marcelo Montenegro
 Alicia Ika (cameo, uncredited)

International Broadcasters

Latin América

 : TV Chile (All broadcast Latin América)
 : Channel 10
 : Canal 13
 : Channel ONE
 : ATB

References

External links
Official web site

1998 telenovelas
1998 Chilean television series debuts
1998 Chilean television series endings
Chilean telenovelas
Chile in fiction
Easter Island in fiction
Spanish-language telenovelas
Televisión Nacional de Chile telenovelas